This is an alphabetized list of musicians notable for playing or having played jazz piano. The piano has been an integral part of the jazz idiom since its inception, in both solo and ensemble settings. Its role is multifaceted due largely to the instrument's combined melodic, harmonic, and rhythmic capabilities.

A

B

C

D

E

F

G

H

I

J

K

L

M

N

O

P

Q 
Andy Quin (born 1960)
Morten Qvenild (born 1978)

R

S

T

U

V

W

Y

Z

References

 
Pianists
Jazz Pianists